Celso Luís Honorato Júnior (born 25 August 1988), known as Celsinho, is a Brazilian footballer who plays for São Caetano as an attacking midfielder.

Club career
Celsinho started his professional career at Associação Portuguesa de Desportos, being promoted to the first team in 2005. He was often compared to Ronaldinho due to physical resemblance and for playing in the same position, having even been invited to portray Ronaldinho in his early days in a movie.

In January 2006, after a stellar 2005 FIFA U-17 World Championship in Peru, where he scored twice for eventual finalists Brazil, both of the goals coming in the knockout stages, Celsinho was bought by Russian club FC Lokomotiv Moscow from Associação Portuguesa de Desportos, where he failed to settle overall due to climate, the overall roughness of football and a bad personal relationship with the team's coach.

Celsinho joined Sporting Clube de Portugal in the 2007 summer, being loaned with the option for a permanent deal. At the Lisbon side, however, he also did not manage to receive significant playing time. His Primeira Liga debut came on 29 September as he featured six minutes in a 0–0 away draw against S.L. Benfica, and his output for the campaign consisted of ten official matches (including nine minutes in a 1–2 loss at A.S. Roma in the UEFA Champions League), none complete.

After being signed permanently, Celsinho moved on loan to fellow league club C.F. Estrela da Amadora to gain more first-team experience. In the season opener, at home against Académica de Coimbra, he started and scored the game's only goal, but fell out of favour shortly after, his last appearance being in late February 2009 (in November of the previous year he was subjected to disciplinary proceedings by both Sporting and Estrela, after being caught in bars in Montijo and Lisbon); Estrela was also relegated due to financial irregularities, after having finished in mid-table.

Celsinho spent one entire year at Sporting without making one single appearance, also failing medicals at several Brazilian teams in view of a transfer. In January 2010 he returned to Portuguesa on loan, being again rarely played.

In early June 2011, Celsinho was loaned again, now to FCM Târgu Mureş in Romania.

Honours
Sporting
Taça de Portugal: 2007–08

Londrina
Campeonato Paranaense: 2014

Paysandu
Campeonato Paraense: 2016
Copa Verde: 2016

References

External links

1988 births
People from Americana, São Paulo
Footballers from São Paulo (state)
Living people
Brazilian footballers
Brazil youth international footballers
Association football midfielders
Associação Portuguesa de Desportos players
FC Lokomotiv Moscow players
Sporting CP footballers
C.F. Estrela da Amadora players
ASA 2013 Târgu Mureș players
Londrina Esporte Clube players
Fortaleza Esporte Clube players
Figueirense FC players
Paysandu Sport Club players
Esporte Clube São Bento players
Esporte Clube Água Santa players
Santa Cruz Futebol Clube players
Vila Nova Futebol Clube players
Associação Desportiva São Caetano players
Campeonato Brasileiro Série A players
Campeonato Brasileiro Série B players
Campeonato Brasileiro Série C players
Campeonato Brasileiro Série D players
Campeonato Paranaense players
Russian Premier League players
Primeira Liga players
Liga I players
Brazilian expatriate footballers
Expatriate footballers in Russia
Brazilian expatriate sportspeople in Russia
Expatriate footballers in Portugal
Brazilian expatriate sportspeople in Portugal
Expatriate footballers in Romania
Brazilian expatriate sportspeople in Romania